An impairment rating is a percentage intended to represent the degree of an individual's impairment, which is a deviation away from one's normal health status and functionality. Impairment is distinct from disability. An individual's impairment rating is based on the restrictive impact of an impairment, whereas disability is broadly the consequences one's impairment. Impairment ratings given to an individual by different medical examiners are sometimes problematically inconsistent with each other.

See also

 Accessibility
 Disability abuse
 Disability discrimination act
 Disability studies
 List of disability rights organizations
 List of physically disabled politicians
 Orthopedics
 Workers' compensation

References

Disability
Medical assessment and evaluation instruments